Ronald Stewart Jenkins (8 December 1907 – 27 December 1975) was a British civil engineer, known for designing the Mulberry Harbours in World War II, in 1944.

Jenkins was born in Sutton, London. From 1928 to 1931 he studied Engineering at the City and Guilds College in London, part of Imperial College London.

He worked with the structural engineer Oscar Faber, and worked at Arup Group, of which he was one of four founders in 1949, becoming a senior partner. At Arup he worked as a concrete shell design engineer. He was known for his mathematical skill.

He worked with Ove Arup to design the Mulberry harbours. There was a memorial service for him on Friday 6 February 1976 at St Peter, Vere Street on Vere Street, Westminster.

Works
 Brynmawr Rubber Factory

References

 Times Obituary, 31 December 1975, page 12

External links
 Structurae
 Picture in 1952 with fellow founders of Arup Group

1907 births
1975 deaths
Alumni of Imperial College London
English civil engineers
Concrete pioneers
English company founders
Ove Arup
People from Sutton, London
20th-century English businesspeople